It's Pimpin' Pimpin' is the second comedy album by Katt Williams. It was released on January 29, 2009, via Warner Bros. Records. Production was handled by Neal Marshall and Thomas Marshall, with Gary Binkow, Jeff Golenberg, Katt Williams and Michael Green serving as executive producers. The album peaked at number 174 on the US Billboard 200, number 1 on the Comedy Albums and number 5 on the Heatseekers Albums.

Track listing

Charts

References

External links

Katt Williams albums
Spoken word albums by American artists
Warner Records albums
2009 debut albums
2000s comedy albums